Drozdovo is a rural locality (a khutor) and the administrative center of Lisichanskoye Rural Settlement, Olkhovatsky District, Voronezh Oblast, Russia. The population was 482 as of 2010. There are 8 streets.

Geography 
Drozdovo is located 12 km northeast of Olkhovatka (the district's administrative centre) by road. Bugayevka is the nearest rural locality.

References 

Rural localities in Olkhovatsky District